An appointed officer of the United States House of Representatives from 1789 until 1995, the doorkeeper of the United States House of Representatives  was chosen by a resolution at the opening of each United States Congress. The Office of the Doorkeeper was based on precedent from the Continental Congresses. Without debate, the first federal Congress created the doorkeeper's position by resolution on April 2, 1789. The doorkeeper controlled access to the House chamber and eventually oversaw the press in the gallery.

The doorkeeper’s most visible job was introducing American presidents and foreign dignitaries to Congress. For 18 years, before the State of the Union address, Doorkeeper James T. Molloy announced, "Mister Speaker, the president of the United States.”

The Office of the Doorkeeper was abolished during the 104th Congress. Thirty-three doorkeepers served until the position was abolished and the office's duties were divided among the sergeant at arms, the clerk of the House, and the newly created chief administrative officer.

List of doorkeepers
Two doorkeepers also served as members of the United States House of Representatives (indicated below by asterisks) either prior to or after their service as a House officer.

Notes

References
Clerk of the House:
House Journal, various editions; Congressional Record, various editions;
 Biographical Directory of the United States Congress (2005);
Congressional Pictorial Directory, various editions;
Congressional Directory, various editions;
Donald Bacon, et al., Encyclopedia of the U.S. Congress, vol. 1 (NY: Simon and Schuster, 1995): 659–661.

Employees of the United States House of Representatives
1789 establishments in the United States